Welcome to the Club is a 1989 Broadway musical with music and lyrics by Cy Coleman. Despite its run of only twelve performances, it was nominated for two Tony Awards, and some other honors.

The musical, set in a New York City jail for alimony violators, opened on April 13, 1989 at the Music Box Theatre. The director of the production was Peter Mark Schifter.

Reviews were poor; the New York Times deemed it "embarrassingly out of touch with the present-day realities of men, women, sex, marriage and divorce", with limited praise given to Coleman's "inconsistent" score. The musical closed nine days after its opening, on April 22, and was considered a flop. However, the musical was nominated for two Tonys: Best Featured Actor in a Musical (Scott Wentworth) and Best Direction of a Musical (Schifter). In addition, actress Sally Mayes, in her Broadway debut, won a 1989 Theatre World award.

Songs

Act I
 A Place Called Alimony Jail - Husbands and Wives
 Pay the Lawyer - Husbands
 Mrs. Meltzer Wants the Money Now! - Arlene Meltzer and Husbands
 That's a Woman - Aaron Bates, Carol Bates and Wives
 Piece of Cake - Eve Aiken and Bruce Aiken
 Rio - Milton Meltzer, Arlene Meltzer, Wives and Gus Bottomly
 Holidays - Arlene Meltzer
 The Trouble with You - Aaron Bates, Carol Bates, Husbands and Wives
 Mother-in-Law - Husbands
 At My Side - Bruce Aiken and Kevin Bursteter

Act II
 Southern Comfort - Winona Shook, Aaron Bates, Wives and Husbands
 The Two of Us - Bruce Aiken and Milton Meltzer
 It's Love! It's Love! - Gus Bottomly and Husbands
 The Name of Love - Carol Bates
 Miami Beach - Arlene Meltzer and Husbands
 Guilty - Winona Shook
 Love Behind Bars - Winona Shook, Aaron Bates and Wives
 At My Side (Reprise) - Kevin Bursteter and Betty Bursteter
 It Wouldn't Be You - Husbands and Wives

Awards and nominations

Original Broadway production

Notes

External links
 

Broadway musicals
1989 musicals
Musicals by Cy Coleman